Bailing Sport Park is a multi-use sport venue located in Shilin District, Taipei, Taiwan. The park has been open since 1989. Total surface area is around 280,000 m2.

Facilities
 5 basketball courts
 5 baseball and softball fields
 1 croquet court
 2 football pitches
 3 rugby fields
 1 roller skating rink
 7 tennis courts

See also
 List of parks in Taiwan

References

External links
 Bailing Sport Park at Taipei Sports Office official website 

Football venues in Taiwan
Parks in Taipei
Sports venues in Taipei
1989 establishments in Taiwan